Gelsey is a given name and a surname. 

Notable people with the given name include:
Gelsey Bell, American singer, songwriter, and actress
Gelsey Kirkland (born 1952), American ballerina

Notable people with the surname include:
Erwin S. Gelsey (died 1988), American screenwriter